Alfred Jauch was a Swiss wrestler. He competed in the men's Greco-Roman lightweight at the 1948 Summer Olympics.

References

External links
 

Year of birth missing
Possibly living people
Swiss male sport wrestlers
Olympic wrestlers of Switzerland
Wrestlers at the 1948 Summer Olympics
Place of birth missing